Taizeni is a small village in southern part of Afghanistan in the Helmand province. The place was emphasized in the news after Afghan Taliban commander and Amir al-Mu'minin, Mullah Mohammed Omar died in the village (according to social media accounts of Taliban). It is believed the commander lived for a while in the village before his death on April 23, 2013.

Social Media Hashtag
Social media hashtags referring to Taizeni on Twitter were employed whilst confirming death of Taliban leader.

References

Populated places in Afghanistan